Versfeld is a surname. Notable people with the surname include:

Berry Versfeld (born 1943), South African cricketer
Cornelis (Kees) Versfeld (born 1948), Canadian oil sands energy management and natural gas manager
Hasie Versfeld (1866–1944), South African rugby union player
Mark Versfeld (born 1976), Canadian swimmer
Marthinus Versfeld (1909–1995), South African philosopher
Oupa Versfeld (1860–1931), South African rugby union player

See also
Loftus Versfeld Stadium, stadium in Pretoria, South Africa